Live At The Galaxy 1967 is a 2014 unofficial live album by American psychedelic rock band Iron Butterfly, recorded on July 4, 1967 at the Galaxy Theater in Los Angeles, California and released as digital download, on digipak CD and deluxe colored 180 gram vinyl LP on the Purple Pyramids Records and Cleopatra Records label. It features the first, original line-up of the band, performing their early singles and songs from their debut album Heavy which was released a little more than six months later (January 22, 1968).

It was recorded live at the historic Galaxy Club located in the heart of the Sunset Strip in Los Angeles with a microphone from the audience.

Track listing
Composition credited to Doug Ingle, unless otherwise noted or indicated (*).

Side A
 Real Fright 2:37
 Possession 4:51
 Filled With Fear 4:31
 Fields Of Sun (Ingle / Darryl DeLoach) 3:31
 It’s Up To You * 2:48
 Gloomy Day To Remember * 2:45
 Evil Temptation (Ingle / DeLoach / Danny Weis / Jerry Penrod /Ron Bushy) 6:45

Side B
 So-Lo (Ingle / Darryl DeLoach) 4:03
 Gentle As It May Seem (DeLoach / Danny Weis) 4:04
 Lonely Boy 5:57
 Iron Butterfly Theme (Ingle / DeLoach) 7:06
 You Can't Win (Charlie Smalls / LeLoach / Weis) 4:35

Personnel 
Doug Ingle - organ, vocals
Danny Weis - electric guitar
Jerry Penrod - bass guitar, backing vocals
Ron Bushy - drums, percussion, backing vocals
 Darryl DeLoach - percussion, vocals

and
Dave Thompson - liner notes

Reception

Fred Thomas of AllMusic didn't give a rating. The album was called "grainy" and that the band was captured "in their earliest, roughest form, working out songs heavy on organ stabs and blues riffing". It was described as "spirited jamming" and a "particularly sharp" club performance in general. The performance of the "Iron Butterfly theme" was regarded "a high point" on the record. The audio quality was "on par with other obscure, audience-recorded artifacts of its era by psych bands like The Electric Prunes and others".

References

External links
Label Shop
CD universe entry

Iron Butterfly live albums
1967 live albums
Cleopatra Records live albums